Brian Richard Ledbetter (born November 18, 1963 in San Diego, California) is an American competitive sailor who won a silver medal in the Finn class at the 1992 Olympic Games in Barcelona.

Career

At the 1988 Summer Olympics, Ledbetter placed 10th in the finn class.

At the 1992 Summer Olympics, Ledbetter finished in 2nd place in the finn class.

At the 2013 Star Class World Championship in San Diego, CA, Ledbetter earned two Gold Chevrons by winning Race 2, on September 2, 2013.

At the 2015 Star Class Western Hemisphere Championship in Miami, FL, Ledbetter finished in 1st place, on April 19, 2015.

References

 ; retrieved 2010-06-09.
 Star Class World Championship Daily 1st, from StarClass.org; retrieved 2013-09-03.

External links
 

1963 births
American male sailors (sport)
Sailors at the 1988 Summer Olympics – Finn
Sailors at the 1992 Summer Olympics – Finn
Olympic silver medalists for the United States in sailing
Sportspeople from San Diego
Living people
Medalists at the 1992 Summer Olympics